Norway sent a delegation to compete at the 1972 Summer Paralympics in Heidelberg, West Germany. They sent twenty eight competitors, nineteen male and nine female.

Medallists

 *Not recognized anymore.

Disability classifications
Athletes at the Paralympics in 1972 were all afflicted by spinal cord injuries and required the use of a wheelchair. This is in contrast to later Paralympics that include events for participants that fit into any of five different disability categories.

References 

Nations at the 1972 Summer Paralympics
1972
1972 in Norwegian sport